The Promise is a solo album by Greek composer and pianist Vassilis Tsabropoulos recorded in 2008 and released on the ECM label.

Reception
The Allmusic review by  Michael G. Nastos awarded the album 3½ stars stating "This album lives up to its under-the-surface, ruminative nature, but should be slotted in for the appropriate mood or time of evening, when lights are either very low, or turned off".

Track listing
All compositions by Vassilis Tsabropoulos
 "The Other" - 5:07   
 "Tale of a Man" - 6:00   
 "Smoke and Mirrors" - 6:59   
 "Pearl" - 3:10   
 "The Promise" - 5:14   
 "The Other, var. I"  3:50   
 "Djivaeri" - 4:43   
 "The Insider" - 7:01   
 "Confession" - 3:56   
 "Promenade" - 4:57   
 "The Other, var. II" - 4:01   
Recorded at Dimitris Mitropoulos Hall in Megaron, Athens in January 2008

Personnel
Vassilis Tsabropoulos - piano

References

2009 albums
ECM Records albums
Vassilis Tsabropoulos albums
Albums produced by Manfred Eicher